is a Japanese voice actress and singer from Kashiba, Nara. She is affiliated with Aoni Production.

Possessing a husky voice, Shiraishi voices young to teenage men as well as young girls and teenage women. However, in a break from tradition, one of her most famous roles is the brash and hot-headed Asuka Kazama, who is noted for speaking with a strong Osaka accent, which is one of Shiraishi's specialist skills. She was also formerly a member of the voice acting unit Drops, along with Ai Nonaka, Akemi Kanda, Tomoko Kaneda, and Mariko Kōda.

Shiraishi married on September 6, 2012, but divorced in 2013.

Filmography

Television animation
GetBackers (2002), Ginji Amano (young)
Air Master (2003), Waitress
Bobobo-bo Bo-bobo (2003), Remu
D.C.: Da Capo (2003), Mikkun
Mugen Senki Potorisu (2003), Yūma
One Piece (2003), Akibi
Pocket Monsters Advanced Generation (2003), Haruka's Wurmple/Silcoon/Beautifly; others
Fafner of the Azure (2004), Rina Nishio
Magical Girl Lyrical Nanoha (2004), Miyuki Takamachi
Tenjho Tenge (2004), Chiaki Kōnoike
Tweeny Witches (2004), Iga
Aria (2005), Ayumi K. Jasmine
Mahoraba ~Heartful Days (2005), Ryūshi Shiratori
Negima! Magister Negi Magi (2005), Kaede Nagase
Noein (2005), Tobi
Shakugan no Shana (2005), Sorath/Aizenji
Xenosaga: The Animation (2005), Mary Godwin
Gintama (2006), Jugem [The Monkey] - eps 221-222; Lord Morimori - ep 222; Onizuka "Himeko" Hime - ep 227
Glass Fleet (2006), Novy
Kekkaishi (2006), Young Yoshimori, (Aoi Shinagawa)
Negima!? (2006), Kaede Nagase
Pocket Monsters Diamond & Pearl (2006), Haruka's Beautifly, child
Hayate the Combat Butler (2007), Hayate Ayasaki; Britney
Hidamari Sketch (2007), Riri
Himawari! (2007), Azami
Kemeko Deluxe! (2007), Ryōko Kurosaki
Mushi-Uta (2007), Kyoko Kazama
Nagasarete Airantō (2007), Rin, Shizuku, Inuinu, Hatsu, others
Sky Girls (2007), Takumi Hayami
Mobile Suit Gundam 00 Second Season (2008), Anew Returner
Naruto Shippuden (2008), Fū, Matatabi
Net Ghost PiPoPa (2008), Pit
Zettai Karen Children (2008), Aoi Nogami
Hatsukoi Limited (2009), Meguru Watase
Hayate the Combat Butler 2nd Season (2009), Hayate Ayasaki
Kaidan Restaurant (2009), Ako Ōzora 
Natsu no Arashi! (2009), Sayōko Arashiyama
Nyan Koi (2009), Kanako Sumiyoshi
Saki (2009), Mako Someya
Bleach (2010), Kyōko Haida
Cobra the Animation (2010), Bonnie
HeartCatch PreCure! (2010), Aya Mizushima
Digimon Xros Wars (2010), Hinomoto Akari; Mervamon; 
Soredemo Machi wa Mawatteiru (2010), Harue Haribara
Working!! (2010), Kazue Takanashi
Astarotte no Omocha! (2011), Porhelga Svarthaed
Beelzebub (2011), Nāga
Horizon in the Middle of Nowhere (2011), Makiko Oriotorai
Oniichan no Koto Nanka Zenzen Suki Janain Dakara ne!! (2011), Hirono Kusuhara
Sket Dance (2011), Hime "Himeko" Onizuka
YuruYuri (2011), Nana Nishigaki 
AKB0048 (2012), Takahashi Minami The 5th / Takamina / Arisawa Shiori
Boku-no-imoutowa"Osaka-okan" (2012), Kyōsuke Ishihara
Danball Senki W (2012), Kojo Asuka
Hayate the Combat Butler: Can't Take My Eyes Off You (2012), Hayate Ayasaki
Ixion Saga DT (2012), Yodogawa Alan
Nisemonogatari (2012), Yozuru Kagenui
Sword Art Online (2012), Yulier
Smile PreCure! (2012), Genki Hino
Yu-Gi-Oh! Zexal II (2012), Ponta
Gundam Build Fighters (2013), Misaki
Kyōsōgiga (2013), Un; Kurama (young)
Senran Kagura (2013), Hikage
Battle Spirits: Saikyou Ginga Ultimate Zero (2014), Garbo, Ian
Blade & Soul (2014), Ron
Broken Blade (2014), Nike
D-Frag! (2014), Sakuragaoka
Saki: The Nationals (2014), Mako Someya
Yowamushi Pedal (2014), Shōkichi Naruko (young)
Amagi Brilliant Park (2014), Macaron
Gugure! Kokkuri-san (2014), Kokkuri-san (female)
Girl Friend Beta (2014), Noriko Kiryu
Death Parade (2015), Quin
My Wife is the Student Council President (2015), Kei Misumi
Nanatsu no Taizai (2015), Goddess Clan
Triage X (2015), Sayo Hitsugi
Aquarion Logos (2015), Sakurako Soda
Chaos Dragon (2015), Setsuren
Tai-Madō Gakuen 35 Shiken Shōtai (2015), Ikaruga Suginami
Sore ga Seiyuu! (2015), Herself
Fafner in the Azure: Exodus (2015), Rina Nishio
Lupin the Third Part 4 (2015), Belladonna
Super Lovers (2016), Kiri Kondō
Fate/kaleid liner Prisma Illya 3rei! (2016), Angelica
ReLIFE (2016), Sumire Inukai
Cheer Boys!! (2016), Kirari Suzuki
Beyblade Burst Evolution (2017), Free De La Hoya
Boruto: Naruto Next Generations (2017), Chocho Akimichi, Eho Norimaki
Kado: The Right Answer (2017), Shimako Yuri
Altair: A Record of Battles (2017), Niki Al-Bahram
Dragon Ball Super (2017), Sanka Ku, Shantza
Beyblade Burst Turbo (2018), Free De La Hoya
Forest of Piano (2018), Kai Ichinose (young)
Yu-Gi-Oh! VRAINS (2018), Haru
Girly Air Force (2019), Rhino
Demon Slayer: Kimetsu no Yaiba (2019), Spider Demon (older sister)
The Life Extra (2019), Riki Shimizu And Maruta
Digimon Adventure: (2020), Sora Takenouchi
Pokémon Master Journeys: The Series (2021), Asahi
World Trigger 2nd Season (2021), Yomi
Yashahime: Princess Half-Demon (2021), Yawaragi
To Your Eternity (2021), Gugu (child)
One Piece (2021), Bao Huang
The Kingdoms of Ruin (2023), Chloe

Original net animation (ONA)
Beyblade Burst Surge(2020), Free De La Hoya
Beyblade Burst Dynamite Battle (2021), Free De La Hoya
Busou Shinki Moon Angel, Zelnogrard
Fastening Days, Kei
Powerful Pro Yakyū Powerful Kōkō-hen, Pawapro
Star Wars: Visions - The Twins (2021), Am

Original video animation (OVA)
Air Gear: Kuro no Hane to Nemuri no Mori, Akito / Agito Wanijima
Dogs: Bullets & Carnage, Mimi
Hayate the Combat Butler, Hayate Ayasaki
Hellsing Ultimate, Schrödinger
Hotori: Tada Saiwai o Koinegau, Suzu
Naisho no Tsubomi, Daiki Nemoto
Negima!?, Kaede Nagase
Pinky:St, Ran
Senran Kagura: Estival Versus – Festival Eve Full of Swimsuits, Hikage
Sky Girls, Takumi Hayami
Zan Sayonara, Zetsubou Sensei Bangaichi, Tane Kitsu
The Day Naruto Became Hokage, Chocho Akimichi

Theatrical animation
Break Blade 4: Sanka no Chi, Nike
Break Blade 5: Shisen no Hate, Nike
Buddha Saitan, Amanokawa Shunta
Cinnamon the Movie, Espresso
Doraemon: Nobita and the Birth of Japan 2016, Kukuru
Fafner in the Azure: Heaven and Earth, Rina Nishio
Farewell, My Dear Cramer: First Touch, Junpei Onda
Happy-Go-Lucky Days, Shin-chan's mother
Hayate the Combat Butler! Heaven Is a Place on Earth, Hayate Ayasaki
Inazuma Eleven GO vs. Danbōru Senki W, Asuka Kojō
Odoru Pokémon Himitsu Kichi, Whismur
Pocket Monsters Advanced Generation the Movie: Deoxys, the Visitor from a Fissure in the Sky, Haruka's Beautifly
Pocket Monsters Advanced Generation the Movie: The Wishing Star of Seven Nights: Jirachi, Pokémon Tachi
Towa no Quon, Yuri

Video games
Armored Hunter Gunhound EX, Juliane Yuri
Arknights, Cliffheart, Fang

Black Matrix OO, Cain
Clannad, Kappei Hiiragi
Crash Fever, Darwin
Corpse Seed 3, Ayumu Asuka
Corpse Seed 3: Heartclub Extreme, Ayumu Asuka
Corpse Seed 4, Ayumu Asuka
Corpse Seed 4: Endless Brawl, Ayumu Asuka
Counter:Side, Kasukabe Yuri(Lee Yuri)
Digimon World Re:Digitize, Taiga
Dead or Alive
Dead or Alive 5, Mila
Dead or Alive 6, Mila
Dragon Ball Xenoverse, Time Patroller (Female 6)
Dragon Ball Xenoverse 2, Time Patroller
Final Fantasy
Final Fantasy Type-0, Rem Tokimiya
Final Fantasy Type-0 HD, Rem Tokimiya
Dissidia Final Fantasy Opera Omnia, Rem Tokimiya
Granblue Fantasy, Loki, Societte
Gunvolt Chronicles: Luminous Avenger iX, Stella
J-Stars Victory VS, Hime "Himeko" Onizuka
JoJo's Bizarre Adventure: All Star Battle, Foo Fighters (F.F.)
JoJo's Bizarre Adventure: Eyes of Heaven, Foo Fighters (F.F.)
Luminous Arc 2: Will, Pip
Mamorukun Curse!, Mamoru Tomoka
Memories Off 5 The Unfinished Film, Ayumu Kise
New Little King's Story, Princess Iris
Naruto Shippuden: Ultimate Ninja Storm 3, Fū
Nier, Devola & Popola
Nier: Automata, Devola & Popola
Rogue Galaxy, Chie, Young Jaster
Rune Factory 3, Mais
Samurai Warriors 4, Koshōshō
Senran Kagura series:
Senran Kagura: Shojo-tachi no Shin'ei, Hikage
Senran Kagura Burst: Guren no Shojo-tachi, Hikage
Senran Kagura Shinovi Versus: Shojo-tachi no Shomei, Hikage
Shin Sakura Wars, Komachi Ohba
Shining Blade, Yukihime
Sonic Unleashed, Chip/Light Gaia
Sunday VS Magazine: Shuuketsu! Choujou Daikessen!, Hayate Ayasaki
Super Robot Wars UX, Rina Nishio, Hurricane
Tales of Legendia, Jay
Tales of Xillia, Sylph
Tekken series:
Tekken 5, Asuka Kazama
Tekken 5: Dark Resurrection, Asuka Kazama
Tekken 6, Asuka Kazama
Tekken 6: Bloodline Rebellion, Asuka Kazama
Tekken Tag Tournament 2, Asuka Kazama
Tekken Tag Tournament 2 Unlimited, Asuka Kazama
Tekken Tag Tournament 2: Wii U Edition, Asuka Kazama
Tekken 3D: Prime Edition, Asuka Kazama
Tekken Revolution, Asuka Kazama
Tekken 7, Asuka Kazama and Kazuya (young)
Tekken 7: Fated Retribution, Asuka Kazama
Until Dawn (Japanese dub), Sam (Hayden Panettiere)
Wild Arms 4, Jude Maverick
Wrestle Angels: Survivor, Tomomi Watanabe & Shiho Kobayakawa
Xenoblade Chronicles X, Avatar
Yakuza series
Yakuza 5, Mai Sanada
Yakuza Kiwami, Saya Date

Tokusatsu
Kishiryu Sentai Ryusoulger (2019), Kleon

Dubbing roles

Live-action
Miley Cyrus
Hannah Montana, Miley Stewart/Hannah Montana
Hannah Montana: The Movie, Miley Stewart/Hannah Montana
The Suite Life on Deck: Wizards on Deck with Hannah Montana, Hannah Montana
The Last Song, Veronica "Ronnie" Miller
Sex and the City 2, Miley Cyrus
The Night Before, Miley Cyrus
Amelia, Elinor Smith (Mia Wasikowska)
Antwone Fisher, Antwone Fisher (age 7) (Malcolm David Kelley)
August Rush, Evan Taylor/August Rush (Freddie Highmore)
Awakening the Zodiac, Zoe Branson (Leslie Bibb)
Back to the Future (2014 BS Japan edition), Jennifer Parker (Claudia Wells)
Bad Genius, Lynn (Chutimon Chuengcharoensukying)
Bel Ami, Kim Bo-tong (IU)
Brain Games, Kristen Bell
The Butler, Carol Hammie (Yaya DaCosta)
Clouds, Sammy Brown (Sabrina Carpenter)
Crouching Tiger, Hidden Dragon: Sword of Destiny, Mantis (Ngô Thanh Vân)
Dark Shadows, Carolyn Stoddard (Chloë Grace Moretz)
The Darkest Minds, Ruby Daly (Amandla Stenberg)
Devil's Pass, Holly King (Holly Goss)
Down in the Valley, Lonnie (Rory Culkin)
Duma, Xan (Alexander Michaeletos)
Eddie's Million Dollar Cook-Off, Oliver (Daniel Costello)
Edge of Winter, Caleb Baker (Percy Hynes White)
Ender's Game, Valentine Wiggin (Abigail Breslin)
EuroTrip, Bert Thomas (Nial Iskhakov)
Fifty Shades of Grey, Anastasia "Ana" Steele (Dakota Johnson)
Fifty Shades Darker, Anastasia "Ana" Steele (Dakota Johnson)
Fifty Shades Freed, Anastasia "Ana" Steele (Dakota Johnson)
The Fighting Temptations, Dean (Darrell Vanterpool)
The Final Cut, Alan Hickman (young) (Casey Dubois)
Fires, Mish McCauley (Charlotte Best)
Flatliners, Courtney Holmes (Elliot Page)
Footloose, Ariel Moore (Julianne Hough)
Foyle's War episode "A War of Nerves", Gwen Rivers (Joanna Horton)
Frailty, Adam (young) (Jeremy Sumpter)
Free Solo, Sanni McCandless
Glee, Sunshine Corazon (Charice)
The Good Doctor, Dr. Claire Brown (Antonia Thomas)
Good Luck Chuck, Charles "Chuck" Logan (young) (Connor Price)
The Great Gatsby, Daisy Buchanan (Carey Mulligan)
The Guest, Anna Peterson (Maika Monroe)
Halo: Nightfall, Macer (Christina Chong)
Happiest Season, Abby (Kristen Stewart)
Home Alone: The Holiday Heist, Finn Baxter (Christian Martyn)
If I Stay, Mia Hall (Chloë Grace Moretz)
The Impossible, Thomas Bennett (Samuel Joslin)
Inception (2012 TV Asahi edition), Ariadne (Ellen Page)
Indiana Jones and the Temple of Doom (2009 WOWOW edition), Short Round (Ke Huy Quan)
It Follows, Jaime "Jay" Height (Maika Monroe)
Jumanji: Welcome to the Jungle, Ruby Roundhouse (Karen Gillan)
Kung Fu Dunk, Li-li (Charlene Choi)
Kyle XY, Lori Trager (April Matson)
Ladder 49, Nicky Morrison (Spencer Berglund)
The Leftovers, Jill Garvey (Margaret Qualley)
The Longshots, Jasmine Plummer (Keke Palmer)
The Lost Daughter, Nina (Dakota Johnson)
The Meddler, Jillian (Cecily Strong)
Men in Black II, Elizabeth (Chloe Sonnenfeld)
Merlin, Mordred (young) (Asa Butterfield)
Olympus Has Fallen, Connor Asher (Finley Jacobson)
Pan Am, Colette Valois (Karine Vanasse)
Piranha 3D, Danni (Kelly Brook)
The Possession, Emily "Em" Brenek (Natasha Calis)
Quantum of Solace (2016 BS Japan edition), Camille Montes (Olga Kurylenko)
Rambo: Last Blood (2022 BS Tokyo edition), Gizelle (Fenessa Pineda)
Ringer, Juliet Martin (Zoey Deutch)
Running Wild with Bear Grylls, Caitlin Parker
Save Haven, Katie Feldman/Erin Tierney (Julianne Hough)
Seoul Station, Hye-sun (Shim Eun-kyung)
Shameless, Tami Tamietti (Kate Miner)
Snake Eyes, Major O'Hara / Scarlett (Samara Weaving)
Soccer Dog: European Cup, Mickey (Eric Don)
Step Up, Nora Clark (Jenna Dewan)
Table 19, Eloise McGarry (Anna Kendrick)
Terra Nova, Maddy Shannon (Naomi Scott)
The Time Traveler's Wife, Clare Abshire (Rose Leslie)
Uncharted, Jo Braddock (Tati Gabrielle)
Underdog, Molly (Taylor Momsen)
The Vampire Diaries, Anna (Malese Jow)
Vampire Academy, Lissa Dragomir (Daniela Nieves)
Vincent N Roxxy, Roxxy (Zoë Kravitz)
When Good Ghouls Go Bad, Ryan Kankle (Craig Marriott)
Witches of East End, Freya Beauchamp (Jenna Dewan)
The Wolf of Wall Street, Naomi Lapaglia (Margot Robbie)
Yellowjackets, Jackie (Ella Purnell)

Animation
101 Dalmatian Street, Dolly
The Adventures of Jimmy Neutron: Boy Genius, Jimmy Neutron
Bolt, Penny
Home, Gratuity "Tip" Tucci
Ice Age: Collision Course, Brooke
Jimmy Neutron: Boy Genius, Jimmy Neutron
Mechamato, Pian
Meet the Robinsons, Lewis
Oni: Thunder God's Tale, Onari
Team Umizoomi, Geo
Tom and Jerry: Blast Off to Mars, Peep
Tom and Jerry's Giant Adventure, Jack
Trese, Alexandra Trese

Notes

References

External links
 at Aoni Production 

1982 births
Living people
Voice actresses from Nara Prefecture
Japanese voice actresses
Japanese video game actresses
Japanese women pop singers
King Records (Japan) artists
Musicians from Nara Prefecture
21st-century Japanese actresses
21st-century Japanese women singers
21st-century Japanese singers
Aoni Production voice actors
20th-century Japanese actresses